Sir Robert Clayton (1629–1707) was a British merchant banker, politician and Lord Mayor of London.

Life
Robert Clayton was born in Northamptonshire, England. He became an apprentice to his uncle, a London scrivener, where he met a fellow apprentice, Alderman John Morris. They became successful businessmen and established the bank, Clayton & Morris Co.

Clayton entered politics, representing London and Bletchingley alternately as a Whig between 1679 and his death in 1707. 
He was knighted in 1671. 
Clayton made a considerable fortune. 
In 1697 he lent the king £30,000 to pay for the army. 
In the mid-1650s Clayton purchased Brownsea Island and its castle.

He was president of the St Thomas' Hospital in London which was then located in the Borough. He employed Thomas Cartwright to rebuild the hospital and St Thomas Church nearby.  

Robert Clayton was a member of the Scriveners and Drapers Company, an Alderman of Cheap Ward in the City of London (1670–1683), a Sheriff in 1671, Lord Mayor of London (1679–1680), a member of parliament for the City of London or Bletchingley for most of the years 1679 to 1707, Colonel of the Orange Regiment, London Trained Bands (various times, 1680–1702), President of the Honourable Artillery Company (1690–1703), Commissioner of the Customs (1689–1697), an Assistant to the Royal African Company (1672–1681) and a director of the Bank of England (1702–1707).

In the 1690s, Clayton was the head of the earliest known Freemason lodge entirely made-up of non-working masons in London.

Links to slavery 
As a member of the Court of Assistants to the Royal African Company, Clayton was essentially on the board of directors. The Royal African Company shipped more African slaves to the Americas than any other institution in the history of the Atlantic slave trade. Clayton married Martha Trott, who was the daughter of a Bermuda merchant, and also acted as Factor in Bermuda.

Legacy 
The tomb of Sir Robert and Lady Clayton is in St Mary's church, Bletchingley.

A statue of Clayton stood at the North Entrance to Ward Block of North Wing at St Thomas' Hospital and is Grade I listed. On 11 June 2020, a joint statement from the Guy's and St Thomas' NHS Foundation Trust announced that Clayton's statue, together with that of Thomas Guy, would be removed from public view.

References

Sources

 Robert Clayton information from AIM25.
 Catalogue record for the papers of Clayton and Morris Co. at the Archives Division of the London School of Economics.
 Melton, F. C., Sir Robert Clayton and the Origins of English Deposit Banking, 1658–1685, Cambridge, 1986.
Dr. J.P. Dickson. MA.,MB.,BChir.(Cantab). St. Thomas's staff 1955. Personal reminiscence.

External links

Clayton Papers. James Marshall and Marie-Louise Osborn Collection, Beinecke Rare Book and Manuscript Library.

1629 births
1707 deaths
People from Northamptonshire
Bankers from London
Knights Bachelor
Members of the Parliament of England for the City of London
Merchants from London
Sheriffs of the City of London
17th-century lord mayors of London
London Trained Bands officers
Date of death unknown
Place of death unknown
17th-century English merchants
Date of birth unknown
English MPs 1679
English MPs 1680–1681
English slave traders